The Fairbanks Exploration Company Machine Shop is a historic machine shop in Fairbanks, Alaska, United States. Located behind the Fairbanks Exploration Company (F.E. Company) administration building at 612 Illinois Street, it is a large single-story steel-frame structure, built in 1927 to serve the company's nearby gold mining operations. A tall double door at the center of the east facade is the main entrance. The front of the building housed large belt-driven lathes, while the center had a welding shop, drill presses, and a tool room. A blacksmithy in the back had a sand floor. The building was used by the F.E. Company between 1927 and 1964.

The building was listed on the National Register of Historic Places in 1995.

See also
National Register of Historic Places listings in Fairbanks North Star Borough, Alaska

References

1927 establishments in Alaska
Buildings and structures completed in 1927
Buildings and structures in Fairbanks, Alaska
Gold mining in Alaska
Industrial buildings and structures on the National Register of Historic Places in Alaska
Buildings and structures on the National Register of Historic Places in Fairbanks North Star Borough, Alaska
Individually listed contributing properties to historic districts on the National Register in Alaska